Danny Bartley (born 3 October 1947 in Paulton, Somerset) is an English former footballer, who made over 400 appearances in the Football League.

He later played for Trowbridge Town, Forest Green Rovers and several Welsh league clubs.

References

1947 births
Living people
English footballers
Bristol City F.C. players
Swansea City A.F.C. players
Hereford United F.C. players
Trowbridge Town F.C. players
English Football League players
People from Paulton
Association football midfielders
Forest Green Rovers F.C. players
Maesteg Park A.F.C. players
Port Talbot Town F.C. players
Bridgend Town A.F.C. players
Llanelli Town A.F.C. players